The EACA EG2000 Colour Genie was a computer produced by Hong Kong-based manufacturer EACA and introduced in Germany in August 1982. It followed their earlier Video Genie I and II computers and was released around the same time as the business-oriented Video Genie.
The BASIC was compatible with the Video Genie I and II and the TRS-80, except for graphic and sound commands; most of the routines for Video Genie I BASIC commands were left over in the Colour Genie's BASIC ROM. Programs were provided to load TRS-80 programs into the Colour Genie. Colour Genie disks could be read in a TRS-80 floppy disk drive and vice versa, editing the pdrive commands.

The original Video Genies had been based upon (and broadly compatible with) the then-current TRS-80 Model I. As the Colour Genie was descended from this architecture, it was incompatible with Tandy's newer TRS-80 Color Computer which - despite its name - was an entirely new and unrelated design based on an entirely different CPU, and thus incompatible with the TRS-80 Model I and derivatives such as the Color Genie.

A 80 column card was produced. The Colour Genie was sold by Schmittke Electronics in Aachen.

Technical specifications

Central Processing Unit

Z80 running at 2.2 MHz. Usually using the NEC D780 (and unlicenced Japanese clone) or the SGS Z80 (a European second source for Zilog).

Internal hardware

 Video Hardware
 Motorola 6845 CRTC
 40×24 text (original ROMs) or 40×25 text (upgraded ROMs), 16 colours, 128 user defined characters
 160×96 graphics (original ROMs) or 160×102 graphics (upgraded ROMs), 4 colours x up to 4 pages
 Sound Hardware
 General Instruments AY-3-8910
 3 sound channels, ADSR programmable
 1 noise channel
 2 8-bit wide I/O ports

I/O ports and power supply

I/O ports:
 Composite video out and audio out (cinch plugs)
 Integrated RF modulator antenna output, which also carries sound, to TV
 Cartridge expansion slot (slot for edge connector with Z80 CPU address/data bus lines and control signals, as well as GND and voltage pins; used for ROM cartridges or the floppy disk controller
 1200 baud tape interface (5 pin DIN)
 RS-232 port (5 pin DIN)
 Lightpen port (5 pin DIN)
 Parallel port for printer or joystick controller

External hardware options

 Floppy disk controller with floppy disk station.
 Supported up to 4 drives (5.25 inch).
 Support for 90 KB SS/SD up to 720 KB DS/DD drives.
 Cassette recorder
 EPROM cartridge of 12 KB
 EG2013 Joystick Controller
 2 Analogue joysticks with keypad

External links
  Colour Genie Homepage 
 Colour Genie games at Everygamegoing Complete list of German and English games for the Colour Genie
 gansweith.freehostia.com/colourgenie/cgenie_en.html Colour Genie Homepage (English Version)
 Colour Genie and information on other EACA machines (English)
 Colour Genie game and review database (English/German)

Z80-based home computers
Home computers